is one of the national universities of Japan, headquartered in Shonan Village (湘南国際村) in the town of Hayama in Kanagawa Prefecture. , as it is generally called in its abbreviated form, was established in 1988, with Dr. Saburo Nagakura as its president. SOKENDAI is the first national university in Japan having offered exclusively graduate programs. Graduate students are trained at affiliated research institutes distributed around Japan and the world. It has both five-year doctoral programs for students with a bachelor's degree and three-year programs for those with a master's degree.

Objective
SOKENDAI is a National Graduate University of Japan, conforming to the guidelines stipulated under the provisions of Japan's National University Corporation Act. The National Graduate Universities' objective is to anticipate the future, nurture specialized researchers with broader visions, and contribute to the public benefit.

Schools
SOKENDAI operates as a distributed research university that cooperates with research institutes throughout Japan. Administration and general courses are provided by SOKENDAI headquarters at the Hayama campus. Specialized courses and research activities are conducted at the host research institutes, including 16 research institutes working under four inter-university research institute corporations, the National Institute of Multimedia Education, and the Institute of Space and Astronautical Science. There are six schools, each offering specialization research programs in collaboration with the research institutes. The six schools include:
Cultural and Social Studies
Physical Sciences
High-Energy Accelerator Science
Multidisciplinary Sciences
Life Science
Advanced Sciences

Rankings 
The Graduate University for Advanced Studies, SOKENDAI has been ranked highly amongst global universities by the Center for World University Rankings (CWUR), placed 598th in the world (top 2.2%) in 2017.  It has also been ranked highly amongst Japanese research universities by U.S. News & World Report, placed 16th in Japan in 2022 based on research strength indicators.

Location 
SOKENDAI main campus is located at Shonan-Kokusai-Mura(Shonan Village), Hayama Town, Miura District, Kanagawa Prefecture, 240-0193 Japan. 

Each of its distributed schools campus is located at the host institutes. 
 Hayama, (Kanagawa Prefecture) - Research Center for Integrative Evolutionary Science, Graduate University for Advanced Studies head office
 Suita, (Osaka Prefecture) - National Museum of Ethnology
 Katsurazaka(Kyoto City), (Kyoto Prefecture) - International Research Center for Japanese Studies 
 Kamigamo(Kyoto City), (Kyoto Prefecture) - Research Institute for Humanity and Nature
 Toki, (Gifu Prefecture) - National Institute for Fusion Science
 Okazaki, (Aichi Prefecture) - Institute for Molecular Science, National Institute for Basic Biology, National Institute for Physiological Sciences
 Mishima, (Shizuoka Prefecture) - National Institute of Genetics
 Sagamihara, (Kanagawa Prefecture) - Institute of Space and Astronautical Science
 Tachikawa, (Tokyo Metropolis) - National Institute of Japanese Literature, National Institute for Japanese Language and Linguistics, National Institute of Polar Research
 Mitaka, (Tokyo Metropolis) - National Astronomical Observatory of Japan
 Chiyoda, (Tokyo Metropolis) - National Institute of Informatics
 Sakura, (Chiba Prefecture) - National Museum of Japanese History
 Tsukuba, (Ibaraki Prefecture) - High Energy Accelerator Research Organization
 Tokai, (Ibaraki Prefecture) - High Energy Accelerator Research Organization
 Mizusawa(Ōshū City), (Iwate Prefecture) - National Astronomical Observatory of Japan
 Nobeyama(Minamimaki Village), (Nagano Prefecture) - National Astronomical Observatory of Japan
 Hawaii, (United States of America) - National Astronomical Observatory of Japan
 Atacama Desert, (Republic of Chile) - National Astronomical Observatory of Japan
 Showa Station, (Antarctica) - National Institute of Polar Research

References 

Japanese national universities
Universities and colleges in Kanagawa Prefecture
Educational institutions established in 1988
Engineering universities and colleges in Japan
1988 establishments in Japan